Odishi may refer to:

 Odishi, a historical district in western Georgia
 Odishi, a village in western Georgia
 Odishi Plain, a plateau in western Georgia
 Odishi Broadcasting Company, a TV and radio company based in western Georgia